Viktor Maslov may refer to:

 Viktor Maslov (footballer, born 1910) (1910–1977), Soviet footballer and coach
 Viktor Maslov (footballer, born 1949) , Ukrainian footballer and football referee
 Viktor Maslov (mathematician) (born 1930), Russian mathematician
 Viktor Maslov (racing driver) (born 1976), Russian race car driver
 Viktor Nikolayevich Maslov (born 1950), Governor of Smolensk Oblast, Russia